Indian Switch is an unincorporated community in Chicot County, Arkansas, United States at the junction of Highway 159 and Highway 52.

References

Unincorporated communities in Arkansas
Unincorporated communities in Chicot County, Arkansas